The 2012 Copa do Brasil de Futebol Feminino was the sixth staging of the competition. The competition started on March 10, 2012, and concluded on June 10, 2012. 32 clubs of all regions of Brazil participated of the cup, which is organized by the Brazilian Football Confederation (CBF).

Competition format
The competition is contested by 32 clubs in a knock-out format where all rounds were played over two legs and the away goals rule was used, but in the first three rounds, if the away team won the first leg with an advantage of at least three goals, the second leg would not be played and the club automatically qualified to the next round.

Table

Semifinals

Final

References

External links
Official website

2012
2012 domestic association football cups
2012 Brazilian football competitions
Copa